Alexandre Negri (born 27 March 1981) is a Brazilian former professional footballer who played as a goalkeeper and who works for Cypriot First Division club Doxa Katokopias  as goalkeeping coach. He signed in 2007 from Aris Thessaloniki. Born in Brazil, he was naturalized as a Cypriot citizen.

Negri previously played for Ponte Preta in the Campeonato Brasileiro.

International career
Negri was called up to the senior Cyprus squad for a UEFA Euro 2016 qualifier against Bosnia and Herzegovina in October 2015.

References

1981 births
Living people
Brazilian emigrants to Cyprus
Brazilian footballers
Cypriot footballers
Association football goalkeepers
2003 CONCACAF Gold Cup players
Liga I players
Super League Greece players
Cypriot First Division players
Cypriot Second Division players
Associação Atlética Ponte Preta players
AC Ajaccio players
FC U Craiova 1948 players
Fortaleza Esporte Clube players
Aris Thessaloniki F.C. players
APOP Kinyras FC players
AEK Larnaca FC players
Doxa Katokopias FC players
ENTHOI Lakatamia FC players
Brazilian expatriate footballers
Brazilian expatriate sportspeople in France
Expatriate footballers in France
Brazilian expatriate sportspeople in Romania
Expatriate footballers in Romania
Brazilian expatriate sportspeople in Greece
Expatriate footballers in Greece
Brazilian expatriate sportspeople in Cyprus
Expatriate footballers in Cyprus